Natarsiini is a tribe of midges in the non-biting midge family (Chironomidae).

Genera & species
Genus Natarsia  Fittkau, 1962
N. nugax (Walker, 1856)
N. punctata (Meigen, 1804)

References

Tanypodinae
Nematocera tribes